Vladislav Alekseyevich Achalov (19 November 1945 – 23 June 2011) was a Soviet general, politician and public figure. Achalov served as the 12th commander of the Soviet Airborne Forces and the deputy minister of defence (1990-1991).

Biography

Early life and military career 
Achalov was born on November 13, 1945 in the village of Atamash, Atninsky District, in the Tatar Autonomous Soviet Socialist Republic. Upon deciding to join the army, he attended the Kazan Tank School of the Red Army, from which he graduated in 1966. He started his career in the army as a commander of a platoon of tanks, and later he became the commander of a company of tanks. In 1973 he graduated from the Academy of Armoured Forces but transferred to the Airborne Forces in 1974, becoming commander of an artillery regiment. In 1975–77 he was a commander of an airborne regiment and later (1977–78) vice-commander of 98th Guards Airborne Division. From 1978-82 he was commander of the 7th Guards Airborne Division. 

In February 1981 he visited Warsaw and in September he participated in "Zapad-81" training exercise. After graduating from the Voroshilov General Staff Academy in 1984, he became the deputy commander of the 2nd Guards Tank Army and 1985 commander of the 8th Guards Army within the Group of Soviet Forces in Germany. In 1987–89 he was working in Leningrad as Chief of Staff, First Deputy Commander of the Leningrad Military District. From January 1989 to December 1990 he was commander of the Soviet Airborne Forces.

Political career and death 
In December 1990, unexpectedly, "with no preliminary discussion, none of the usual procedures such as interviews with the Central Committee or the Poltburo," he was made a deputy minister of defence. This lasted until August 1991. After the August 1991 coup he was sent to a sanatorium, "the usual preliminary to enforced retirement." He was a member of Supreme Council of Russian Soviet Republic in 1990–1993.

A supporter of the failed coup attempts of 1991 and 1993, in his later years he led a union of veteran paratroopers and organised a large protest against Yeltsin's policies. Achalov died at a Moscow hospital on 23 June 2011, aged 65.

Family 
He was married in 1974 to Larisa Pavlovna Gudzi, and had a son and daughter.

Further reading
 Ostrovsky, Alexander (2014). Расстрел «Белого дома». Чёрный октябрь 1993 (The shooting of the "White House". Black October 1993) — М.: «Книжный мир», 2014. — 640 с. ISBN 978-5-8041-0637-0

References 

1945 births
2011 deaths
People from Arsky District
Soviet colonel generals
Military Academy of the General Staff of the Armed Forces of the Soviet Union alumni
Commanders of the Soviet Airborne Forces
Burials in Troyekurovskoye Cemetery
Defenders of the White House (1993)
Recipients of the Order "For Service to the Homeland in the Armed Forces of the USSR", 1st class
Recipients of the Order "For Service to the Homeland in the Armed Forces of the USSR", 2nd class
Recipients of the Order "For Service to the Homeland in the Armed Forces of the USSR", 3rd class
Members of the Supreme Soviet of Russia